The International Human Epigenomics Consortium (IHEC) was launched in 2010 to coordinate global efforts in the field of epigenomics. IHEC aims to generate at least 1,000 reference baseline human epigenomes from different types of normal and disease-related human cell types.

References

External links
 IHEC project page

Medical research organizations
Organizations_established_in_2010
Epigenetics